Yrjö Oskar Ruutu (until 1927 Ruuth; 26 December 1887 Helsinki – 27 August 1956 Helsinki) was a Finnish social scientist and politician. Ruutu was the first principal of the School of Social Sciences (current University of Tampere) 1925–1932, 1935–1945 and 1949–1953, and the first Finnish professor of International relations 1949–1954. Ruutu was the first in Finland to defend his doctoral thesis on social sciences and wrote the first Finnish presentation on international relations as a science. He was also the head of the National Board of Education 1945–1950.

Early life and education 
Yrjö Ruutu was born 26 December 1887 in Helsinki. In 1907 he entered the university and received a Bachelor of Philosophy in 1910 and a PhD in 1922.

Jäger activism (1914–1918) 
Ruutu was member of the governing body of the Student Union of the University of Helsinki 1912–1915 and its chairman 1913–1915. He was member of a circle of student activists opposing the Russification of Finland. This group was responsible for starting the Jäger movement, and Ruutu was one of the people who organised the founding meeting of the central committee in 1914. According to Pehr Norrmén, Ruutu was the one to suggest funneling volunteers to Germany and organising these veterans to form the revolutionary vanguard in Finland.

Ruutu was an active Jäger recruiter and wrote propaganda leaflets to aid in recruitment. He was arrested by Russian authorities in 1916 and was sent to Shpalernaya Pretrial Detention Prison in St. Petersburg. He was likely to be executed, but like the rest of the Finnish activist imprisoned there, the authorities never had time to carry out the sentences as the prisoners were released by a mob in 1917. Ruutu took part in the civil war in Finland in the white guard as the adjutant of the commander of the regiment of North Savo. He was awarded the Order of the Cross of Liberty first and second class and the Order of the Cross of Liberty third class with swords.

Political career 
The central theme of Ruutu's political thought was combining socialism and nationalism. In his youth he was one of the most important figures of the Jäger movement and later adopted the view that the Finnish independence can be best guaranteed by removing class conflict from the society by introducing state socialism. Ruutu was a member of several different parties from the National Coalition Party to the Finnish People's Democratic League and led a party of his own. Although "Ruutuite" socialism never became a mass movement, it is considered to have had a considerable influence on the ideology of the Academic Karelia Society and president Urho Kekkonen.

Impact on the Academic Karelian Society and the language question 
Although Ruutu's own organizations remained small, his ideas became popular among the broader student politics in the 1920s. Ruutu served for the second time as chairman of the student union in 1922–1923, when language disputes began to re-emerge at the University of Helsinki. After resigning in the middle of the term in the autumn of 1923, Ruutu criticized the new University Act and proposed that Swedish-speaking education and culture in Finland be supported with state funds only in proportion to the Swedish-speaking population. The principle of complete Finnicization of the Finnish society as presented by Ruutu later became a key requirement of the so-called "Genuine Finnishness" movement. Ruutu believed that under pressure the Swedish-speaking population would have to adopt "genuine" Finnish culture.

Several supporters of Ruutu rose to influential positions in the Academic Karelia Society. In particular, Niilo Kärki's appointment as AKS's vice-president in 1923 marked the transmission of some of Ruutu's ideas to the AKS program. Ruutu himself was not a member of the AKS, but was a member of the editorial board of its magazine Suomen Heimo. The AKS now stated that it also supported the view expressed in Ruutu's book "The Karelian Question in 1917–1920" (1921) that the future of East Karelia should be decided on the basis of Karelians' own interests and self-government, rather than just seeking territorial conquests for Finland. Despite of the adoption of Ruutu's language nationalism, however, the central part of the Ruutu's ideology, state socialism, never became part of the AKS program, probably because it was considered too radical. Ruutu was later disappointed with the ideological development of the AKS and left the group when the late 1920s came.

The language disputes in the student world also reiterated the demand for Finnicization of Swedish surnames. Ruutu himself translated his surname from Ruuth to Ruutu in 1927. Ruutu was the original name of his family. Ruutu's AKS supporters Urho Kekkonen and Martti Haavio organized him becoming the chairman of the Association of Finnish Culture and Identity in 1928.

National Socialist Union of Finland 
Ruutu founded the National Socialist Union of Finland in 1932 together with Juhani Konkka and was declared its "chief" (analogous to Führer). The party used uniforms, the Roman salute and swastikas. Ruutu was also the first one to introduce the concept of Volksgemeinschaft to the Finnish political lexicon. He was attracted to fascism by the promise of removal of class conflict and an economic theory that puts the "national whole" first. Ruutu's interpretation of Nazism was closer to the left-wing of the Nazi party. However, this was no obstacle to joining to prominent Finnish orthodox Nazis such as Yrjö Raikas and Ensio Uoti who were in close contact with the Nazi leadership, and party members were later recruited to the Waffen SS.

References

Finnish People's Democratic League
Academic staff of the University of Tampere
Rectors of universities and colleges in Finland
Finnish political scientists
Social Democratic Party of Finland politicians
People of the Finnish Civil War (White side)
1887 births
1956 deaths
Finnish Nazis
Strasserism
Nazi politicians
Nazis from outside Germany
20th-century political scientists